Sequence Alignment Map (SAM) is a text-based format  originally for storing biological sequences aligned to a reference sequence developed by Heng Li and Bob Handsaker et al. It was developed when the 1000 Genomes Project wanted to move away from the MAQ mapper format and decided to design a new format. The overall TAB-delimited flavour of the format came from an earlier format inspired by BLAT’s PSL. The name of SAM came from Gabor Marth from University of Utah, who originally had a format under the same name but with a different syntax more similar to a BLAST output. It is widely used for storing data, such as nucleotide sequences, generated by next generation sequencing technologies, and the standard has been broadened to include unmapped sequences. The format supports short and long reads (up to 128 Mbp) produced by different sequencing platforms and is used to hold mapped data within the Genome Analysis Toolkit (GATK) and across the Broad Institute, the Wellcome Sanger Institute, and throughout the 1000 Genomes Project.

Format 
The SAM format consists of a header and an alignment section. The binary equivalent of a SAM file is a Binary Alignment Map (BAM) file, which stores the same data in a compressed binary representation. SAM files can be analysed and edited with the software SAMtools. The header section must be prior to the alignment section if it is present. Headings begin with the '@' symbol, which distinguishes them from the alignment section. Alignment sections have 11 mandatory fields, as well as a variable number of optional fields.

Description
From the specification:
 QNAME: Query template NAME. Reads/segments having identical QNAME are regarded to come from the same template. A QNAME ‘*’ indicates the information is unavailable. In a SAM file, a read may occupy multiple alignment lines, when its alignment is chimeric or when multiple mappings are given.  
 FLAG: Combination of bitwise FLAGs
 RNAME: Reference sequence NAME of the alignment. If @SQ header lines are present, RNAME (if not ‘*’) must be present in one of the SQ-SN tag. An unmapped segment without coordinate has a ‘*’ at this field. However, an unmapped segment may also have an ordinary coordinate such that it can be placed at a desired position after sorting. If RNAME is ‘*’, no assumptions can be made about POS and CIGAR.   
 POS: 1-based leftmost mapping POSition of the first matching base. The first base in a reference sequence has coordinate 1. POS is set as 0 for an unmapped read without coordinate. If POS is 0, no assumptions can be made about RNAME and CIGAR.   
 MAPQ: MAPping Quality. It equals −10 log10 Pr{mapping position is wrong}, rounded to the nearest integer. A value 255 indicates that the mapping quality is not available.   
 CIGAR: Concise Idiosyncratic Gapped Alignment Report (CIGAR) string.   
 RNEXT: Reference sequence name of the primary alignment of the NEXT read in the template. For the last read, the next read is the first read in the template. If @SQ header lines are present, RNEXT (if not ‘*’ or ‘=’) must be present in one of the SQ-SN tag. This field is set as ‘*’ when the information is unavailable, and set as ‘=’ if RNEXT is identical RNAME. If not ‘=’ and the next read in the template has one primary mapping (see also bit 0x100 in FLAG), this field is identical to RNAME at the primary line of the next read. If RNEXT is ‘*’, no assumptions can be made on PNEXT and bit 0x20.   
 PNEXT: Position of the primary alignment of the NEXT read in the template. Set as 0 when the information is unavailable. This field equals POS at the primary line of the next read. If PNEXT is 0, no assumptions can be made on RNEXT and bit 0x20.   
 TLEN: signed observed Template LENgth. If all segments are mapped to the same reference, the unsigned observed template length equals the number of bases from the leftmost mapped base to the rightmost mapped base. The leftmost segment has a plus sign and the rightmost has a minus sign. The sign of segments in the middle is undefined. It is set as 0 for single-segment template or when the information is unavailable.   
 SEQ: segment SEQuence. This field can be a ‘*’ when the sequence is not stored. If not a ‘*’, the length of the sequence must equal the sum of lengths of M/I/S/=/X operations in CIGAR. An ‘=’ denotes the base is identical to the reference base. No assumptions can be made on the letter cases.   
 QUAL: ASCII of base QUALity plus 33 (same as the quality string in the Sanger FASTQ format). A base quality is the phred-scaled base error probability which equals −10 log10 Pr{base is wrong}. This field can be a ‘*’ when quality is not stored. If not a ‘*’, SEQ must not be a ‘*’ and the length of the quality string ought to equal the length of SEQ.

Bitwise flags 
The FLAG field is displayed as a single integer, but is the sum of bitwise flags to denote multiple attributes of a read alignment.  Each attribute denotes one bit in the binary representation of the integer.

The FLAG attributes are summed to get the final value, e.g. a SAM row resulting from an Illumina paired-end FASTQ record having the FLAG value 2145 would indicate:

Optional fields
From the specification:

The type may be one of A (character), B (general array), f (real number), H (hexadecimal array), i (integer), or Z (string).

See also
 The FASTA format, used to represent genome sequences
 The FASTQ format, used to represent DNA sequencer reads along with quality scores
 The GVF format (Genome Variation Format), an extension based on the GFF3 format

References

Bioinformatics
Biological sequence format